Mikhail (Moisei) Abramovich Schweitzer (16 February 1920, Perm – 2 June 2000, Moscow) was a Soviet and Russian film director and screenwriter. People's Artist of the USSR (1990).

Biography 
Mikhail Schweitzer graduated from the Gerasimov Institute of Cinematography in the directing class of the Sergei Eisenstein art workshop. He started to work at Mosfilm since 1943. Schweitzer was an assistant director of Man No 217 film production in 1944. Mikhail Romm was a director of that film. When Schweitzer lost his job after his first movie Glorious Path which was filming in the contestation with a cosmopolitism period, he could be accepted to work at Sverdlovsk Film Studio only with Mikhail Romm's help.

Filmography
 Glorious Path (1949)
 Other People's Relatives (1955)
 Sasha Enters Life (1956)
Resurrection (1960–1962)
 Time, Forward! (1965)
 The Golden Calf (1968)
 Funny People (1974)
 The Flight of Mr. McKinley (1976)
 Little Tragedies (1979)
 Dead Souls (1984)
 The Kreutzer Sonata (1987)

Awards
 Honored Art Worker of the RSFSR (1965)
 People's Artist of the RSFSR (1977)
 USSR State Prize (1977)
 Vasilyev Brothers State Prize of the RSFSR (1989)
 People's Artist of the USSR (1990)
 Order of Honour (1995)
 Order "For Merit to the Fatherland", 3rd class (2000)
 Nika Award (2000)

References

External links

Mikhail Schweitzer at kino-teatr.ru 
Mikhail Schweitzer Died. Independed Newspaper 

1920 births
2000 deaths
20th-century Russian screenwriters
Male screenwriters
20th-century Russian male writers
Mass media people from Perm, Russia
Gerasimov Institute of Cinematography alumni
Academic staff of High Courses for Scriptwriters and Film Directors
People's Artists of the RSFSR
People's Artists of the USSR
Recipients of the Nika Award
Recipients of the Order "For Merit to the Fatherland", 3rd class
Recipients of the Order of Honour (Russia)
Recipients of the USSR State Prize
Recipients of the Vasilyev Brothers State Prize of the RSFSR

Russian film directors
Russian Jews
Soviet film directors
Soviet Jews
Soviet screenwriters